Alexandros Spanoudakis (8 July 1928 – 10 March 2019) was a Greek basketball player. He represented the Greece men's national basketball team. Along with his brother, Ioannis, he is considered to be one of the early leading pioneers of the sport of modern basketball in the country of Greece. While a member of the Greek Basket League club Olympiacos, he became the first Greek basketball player to shoot jump shots in the modern style and technique, in the 1950s.

Club career
Spanoudakis played basketball at the club level with the Greek Basket League team Olympiacos. While with Olympiacos in the 1950s, Spanoudakis trained with Bob Cousy and Greek-American Lou Tsioropoulos, of the NBA's Boston Celtics, in Greece. Spanoudakis, and his brother, Ioannis, learned the American style of basketball from the two Celtics players, and they were the first two athletes to bring American basketball techniques to Greece.

National team career
Spanoudakis was a member of the Greece men's national basketball team. With Greece, they won the bronze medal at the 1949 EuroBasket. He played at the 1951 EuroBasket, and at the 1952 Summer Olympic Games.

References

External links
Alekos Spanoudakis at fiba.com (archive)
Alekos Spanoudakis at Sports-reference.com
Alekos Spanoudakis at basket.gr 

1928 births
2019 deaths
Basketball players at the 1952 Summer Olympics
Basketball players at the 1955 Mediterranean Games
Greek Basket League players
Greek men's basketball players
Mediterranean Games bronze medalists for Greece
Olympiacos B.C. players
Olympic basketball players of Greece
Shooting guards
Mediterranean Games medalists in basketball
Basketball players from Chania